The 1989–90 Bundesliga was the 27th season of the Bundesliga, the premier football league in West Germany. It began on 28 July 1989 and ended on 12 May 1990. FC Bayern Munich were the defending champions.

Competition modus
Every team played two games against each other team, one at home and one away. Teams received two points for a win and one point for a draw. If two or more teams were tied on points, places were determined by goal difference and, if still tied, by goals scored. The team with the most points were crowned champions while the two teams with the fewest points were relegated to 2. Bundesliga. The third-to-last team had to compete in a two-legged relegation/promotion play-off against the third-placed team from 2. Bundesliga.

Team changes to 1988–89
Stuttgarter Kickers and Hannover 96 were directly relegated to the 2. Bundesliga after finishing in the last two places. They were replaced by Fortuna Düsseldorf and FC Homburg. Relegation/promotion play-off participant Eintracht Frankfurt won on aggregate against 1. FC Saarbrücken and thus retained their Bundesliga status.

Team overview

League table

Results

Relegation play-offs
VfL Bochum and third-placed 2. Bundesliga team 1. FC Saarbrücken had to compete in a two-legged relegation/promotion play-off. Bochum won 2–1 on aggregate and retained their Bundesliga status.

Top goalscorers
18 goals
  Jørn Andersen (Eintracht Frankfurt)

15 goals
  Stefan Kuntz (1. FC Kaiserslautern)

13 goals
  Fritz Walter (VfB Stuttgart)
  Roland Wohlfarth (FC Bayern Munich)

11 goals
  Falko Götz (1. FC Köln)

10 goals
  Hans-Jörg Criens (Borussia Mönchengladbach)
  Uwe Freiler (SV Waldhof Mannheim)
  Jan Furtok (Hamburger SV)
  André Golke (FC St. Pauli)
  Uwe Leifeld (VfL Bochum)
  Alan McInally (FC Bayern Munich)
  Andreas Möller (Borussia Dortmund)
  Wynton Rufer (SV Werder Bremen)
  Michael Zorc (Borussia Dortmund)

Champion squad

References

External links
 DFB Bundesliga archive 1989/1990

Bundesliga seasons
1
Germany